Highway 55 is an east-west highway in central Israel. Its Western terminus is in   Kfar Saba, and it continues east to Nablus.  Much of the road follows the eastern section of the "Aphek Ascent", an ancient east-west trade route connecting the Via Maris and the Way of the Patriarchs.

The road passes near Qalqilya, Alfei Menashe, Azzun, Karnei Shomron and Kedumim, and ends in Nablus.

After the First Intifada and the blocking of the road by Palestinians in the late 1980s and early 1990s, a number of bypass roads were built, south of Qalqilya and north of Azzun.  Today the road serves the 20,000 Jews along its route and the 100,000 Arabs who live between Qalqilya and Nablus.

External links
Court case regarding Highway 55 (Hebrew, PDF)

See also
List of highways in Israel

55